Morten Frimodt Nielsen (born 14 August 1982) is a Danish professional association football player who is currently playing at Rishøj Boldklub. He plays as a defender. His twin brother, Søren, also plays for Rishøj BK.

References

1982 births
Living people
Danish men's footballers
Association football defenders
Køge Boldklub players
HB Køge players
Danish twins
Twin sportspeople
Køge Nord FC players
People from Køge Municipality
Sportspeople from Region Zealand